The Italy women's national under-18 volleyball team represents Italy in international women's volleyball competitions and friendly matches under the age 18 and it is ruled by the Italian Volleyball Federation That is an affiliate of Federation of International Volleyball FIVB and also a part of European Volleyball Confederation CEV.

History

Results

Summer Youth Olympics
 Champions   Runners up   Third place   Fourth place

FIVB U19 World Championship
 Champions   Runners up   Third place   Fourth place

Europe U18 / U17 Championship
 Champions   Runners up   Third place   Fourth place

Team

Current squad
The following is the Italian roster in the 2017 FIVB Girls' U18 World Championship.

Head coach: Marco Mencarelli

References

External links
  Official website 

National women's under-18 volleyball teams
Volleyball
Volleyball in Italy
Women's volleyball in Italy